Swan was launched at Greenock, Scotland, in 1800. She traded widely until in 1805 she became a slave ship in the triangular trade in enslaved people. She was lost in 1806 while delivering captives.

Career
Swan appeared in Lloyd's Register (LR) in 1800 with Hattrick, master, Ritchie, owner, and trade Greenock–Jamaica, changing to Greenock–Newfoundland.

Swans first owner was Walter Ritchie & Sons. At the beginning of the 19th century, Walter Ritchie & Sons was one of the best known Greenock firms of shipowners. In 1808 Walter Ritchie moved to London to manage his London business. His sons then took charge of eleven ships, "by far the finest mercantile fleet...in Great Britain belonging to one firm."

Enslaving voyage: Captain D. Smith sailed from England on 1 November 1805. Swan acquired captives in the region and then sailed for Charleston. South Carolina, in the United States. She was wrecked near Charleston on 10 May 1806 without loss of life. Reportedly, she landed 194 captives. The entry for her in the Register of Shipping for 1806 has the annotation "LOST" by her name.

In December 1803, the South Carolina General Assembly had voted to reopen the African slave trade. Concern with the spread of yellow fever had caused the Assembly to suspend the slave trade. The Medical Society of South Carolina relaxed quarantine measures, prioritizing reopening the slave trade over public health. The Medical Society argued that the fever was not imported (correct), and not contagious. Later it was discovered that the disease was not directly contagious, but was mosquito-borne, and so indirectly contagious, and that quarantine would help reduce the spread.

In 1806, 33 British enslaving ships were lost. Eight were lost on the Middle Passage, sailing from Africa to the West Indies of the United States. Although Swan was lost to the perils of the sea, during the period 1793 to 1807, war, rather than maritime hazards or resistance by the captives, was the greatest cause of vessel losses among British slave vessels.

Citations

References
 
 
 
 

1800 ships
Ships built in Scotland
Age of Sail merchant ships of England
London slave ships
Maritime incidents in 1806
Shipwrecks in the Atlantic Ocean
Shipwrecks of the Carolina coast